Alexander Alan Budikusuma Wiratama (born 29 March 1968, as Goei Djien Phang) is a former Indonesian badminton player who excelled at the world level from the late 1980s to the mid-1990s.

Career 
In 1991 he was runner-up to China's Zhao Jianhua at the IBF World Championships in Copenhagen. He won the 1992 Olympic men's singles gold medal at Barcelona, defeating fellow countryman Ardy Wiranata in the final. This achievement, together with a gold medal for his then fiancé Susi Susanti, was historical for Indonesia winning the first Olympic golden medals in 50 years history of the country. A crowd estimated at 500,000 to one million Indonesians lined the streets of Jakarta when Susi Susanti and Alan Budikusuma came home in August 1992 and received a two-hour parade. Governor of West Java Yogie S. M. awarded him an honorary West Java citizenship following his victory.

Among his titles, all in singles, are the Thailand Open (1989, 1991), China Open (1991), German Open (1992), Indonesian Open (1993), World Cup (1993), and Malaysian Open (1995). Budikusuma was a member of world champion Indonesian Thomas Cup teams in 1996.

Personal life 
He is married to Susi Susanti (王蓮香), a women's badminton Olympic gold medalist (also in 1992). Together they have three children Lourencia Averina, born 1999, Albertus Edward, born in 2000 and Sebastianus Frederick, born in 2003. Alan and Susi have a badminton club in North Jakarta. Alan Budi has a younger brother named Yohan Hadikusuma who is also a badminton player but representing Hong Kong.

Achievements

Olympic Games 
Men's singles

World Championships 
Men's singles

World Cup 
Men's singles

Asian Games 
Men's singles

IBF World Grand Prix 
The World Badminton Grand Prix sanctioned by International Badminton Federation (IBF) since 1983.

Men's singles

 IBF Grand Prix tournament
 IBF Grand Prix Finals tournament

References

External links 
 
 
 
 

1968 births
Living people
Sportspeople from Surabaya
Indonesian Roman Catholics
Indonesian sportspeople of Chinese descent
Indonesian male badminton players
Badminton players at the 1992 Summer Olympics
Badminton players at the 1996 Summer Olympics
Olympic badminton players of Indonesia
Olympic gold medalists for Indonesia
Olympic medalists in badminton
Medalists at the 1992 Summer Olympics
Badminton players at the 1990 Asian Games
Asian Games bronze medalists for Indonesia
Asian Games medalists in badminton
Medalists at the 1990 Asian Games
Competitors at the 1989 Southeast Asian Games
Competitors at the 1991 Southeast Asian Games
Southeast Asian Games silver medalists for Indonesia
Southeast Asian Games medalists in badminton
World No. 1 badminton players
20th-century Indonesian people